Thanasi Kokkinakis and Nick Kyrgios were the defending champions, but were no longer eligible to compete in junior tennis.

Orlando Luz and Marcelo Zormann defeated Stefan Kozlov and Andrey Rublev in the final, 6–4, 3–6, 8–6 to win the boys' doubles tennis title at the 2014 Wimbledon Championships.

Seeds

  Stefan Kozlov /  Andrey Rublev (final)
  Quentin Halys /  Johan Tatlot (quarterfinals)
  Orlando Luz /  Marcelo Zormann (champions)
  Michael Mmoh /  Frances Tiafoe (second round)
  Pedro Martínez /  Jaume Munar (quarterfinals)
  Francisco Behamonde /  Matías Zukas (second round)
  Petros Chrysochos /  Nino Serdarušić (semifinals)
  Kamil Majchrzak /  Jan Zieliński (first round)

Draw

Finals

Top half

Bottom half

References

External links

Boys' Doubles
Wimbledon Championship by year – Boys' doubles